Henry H. Krusekopf (1886–1979) was a leading expert on soil, spending 48 years as a professor and researcher in the College of Agriculture at the University of Missouri, where he was also a founding member of FarmHouse fraternity.  He received his B.S. in agriculture in 1908 and his masters in 1916 from the University of Missouri in Columbia, Missouri.

He did graduate work at Illinois in 1931–32. He was the author of numerous publications and journals on soil development and soil survey.

"Krusey" was a member of a number of scientific, honorary and professional societies. He also consulted a number of federal and international agencies on agriculture, flood control, forestry and Indian land claims.

In his spare time, Krusekopf owned and operated a farm in southeast Missouri.

References
 Material pulled from the records of FarmHouse International Fraternity, Inc.

External links

University of Missouri alumni
University of Illinois alumni
1886 births
1979 deaths
FarmHouse founders